The 3rd Mechanized Infantry Brigade "RIMINI" (3η Μηχανοκίνητη Ταξιαρχία «ΡΙΜΙΝΙ») is a mechanized infantry brigade of the Hellenic Army based at Kavyli, Orestiada.

History 
The brigade was established on 1885 at Trikala as a regiment and took part in the Allied intervention in the Russian Civil War in the aftermath of World War I. It also participated in the Asia Minor Campaign under the command of Nikolaos Plastiras.

Structure 

 HQ Company (ΙΣΤ/3ης Μ/Κ ΤΑΞ ΠΖ) based at Kavyli.
 311th Armored Battalion (311 ΕΜΑ) at Orestiada.
 502nd Mechanized Infantry Battalion (502 M/K ΤΠ) at Kavyli.
 503rd Mechanized Infantry Battalion (503 M/K ΤΠ) at Nea Vyssa.
508th Mechanized Infantry Battalion (508 M/Κ ΤΠ) at Rizia
 616th Mechanized Infantry Battalion (616 M/K ΤΠ) at Lepti.
 105th Self Propelled Artillery Battalion (105 Μ Α/K ΠΒ) at Kavyli.
 3rd Antitank Company (3 ΛΑΤ)
 3rd Engineer Company (3 ΛΜΧ)
 3rd Signal Company (3 ΛΔΒ)
 3rd Support Battalion (3 ΤΥΠ)

Mechanized infantry brigades of Greece